According to the Book of Mormon and other Latter Day Saint movement sources, the Liahona is a brass ball that operated as a type of compass with two spindles. One of the spindles was said to point the direction Lehi and his party should travel after their escape from Jerusalem, but it only worked when they were faithful. The Book of Mormon states that the Liahona also contained periodic written instructions from God. According to some sources, the Liahona was among the Book of Mormon artifacts Joseph Smith said were found with the golden plates.

In the Book of Mormon
In the Book of Mormon, the Liahona was found one morning at Lehi's tent door. It is described as a round brass ball of "curious workmanship" with "two spindles", one of which indicated the direction that his party should travel. It is sometimes referred to as a compass, although the context makes it clear that it did not function like a magnetic compass. On occasion there was also writing on the ball that displayed additional instructions from God. Using the Liahona, Lehi and his party were directed through the wilderness and across the ocean to the Americas. The Liahona worked "according to the faith and diligence" with which they heeded its direction, and ceased functioning at times when the members of the party demonstrated a loss of faith in God's commandments, notably when Nephi's brothers rebelled against Lehi during their ocean crossing.

The only place in the Book of Mormon where the word "Liahona" is used is in the Book of Alma, when Alma, speaking to his son Helaman, explains "our fathers called it Liahona, which is, being interpreted, a compass". Alma tells his son that "it is as easy to give heed to the word of Christ ... to eternal bliss, as it was for our fathers to give heed to this compass ... to the promised land".

Meaning of the word Liahona
According to the Book of Mormon, the word Liahona means "a compass". Latter-day Saint scholar Hugh Nibley also provided two additional possibilities for the meaning based on perceived Hebrew roots. He attributed the theory that it refers to a "queen bee" to a Hebrew University scholar named Shunary, and added his own speculation that Liyahhona might be translated "To God is the guidance."

Jonathan Curci suggested that the word means "the direction of the Lord".

See also

 Astrolabe

References

Further reading

External links

Book of Mormon artifacts
Book of Mormon words and phrases
Navigational equipment